The Milwaukee Public Theatre was theatre based in Milwaukee, Wisconsin.

History
It was founded in 1974 as Friends Mime Theatre by Barbara Leigh and Michael John Moynihan and has since created over 400 productions. The Public Theatre performs at over 400 events a year attended by 100,000 to 150,000 people.

In 2019, it became defunct after performing a potluck circus, "Passing the Torch".

Past productions 
 Most Dangerous Women - April 22–24, 2016
 Stories from the Medicine Wheel - March 20–27, 2015
 MPT Steampunk Circus of Metamorphosis - September 19, 2014
 From the Start Consider the Finish - October 18, 2011
 From the Start Consider the Finish - October 15, 2011
 From the Start Consider the Finish - October 14, 2011
 From the Start Consider the Finish - October 11, 2011
 From the Start Consider the Finish - October 9, 2011
 From the Start Consider the Finish - October 4, 2011
 From the Start Consider the Finish - September 24, 2011
 From the Start Consider the Finish - September 23, 2011
 From the Start Consider the Finish - September 11, 2011
 From the Start Consider the Finish - September 10, 2011
 One Man's Trash is Another Man's Treasure - May 7, 2010
 Camp We-Kan-Tak-It - October 8, 2009
 All-City People's Parade and Pageant - August 8, 2009
 Winter Voices - December 4–5, 2008

References

External links 
 Official website

Culture of Milwaukee
Theatre companies in Milwaukee
2019 disestablishments in the United States